Tricolia speciosa, common name the Mediterranean pheasant, is a species of sea snail, a marine gastropod mollusk in the family Phasianellidae.

Description
The height of the shell varies between 7 mm and 13 mm. The thin, shining shell has an ovate-elongate shape. It is white, with alternate red and white short flammules below the sutures, and several revolving series of white spots.  The interstices are covered with fine pink or yellowish obliquely descending lines. The five, convex whorls are separated by deeply constricting sutures. The aperture is long-oval, and rather produced below. The posterior angle is occupied by a heavy callus.

Distribution
This species occurs in the Mediterranean Sea and in the Adriatic Sea.

References

 Guérin, M.F.E.1829. Iconographie du règne animal de G. Cuvier: ou, représentation d'après nature de l'une des espèces les plus et souvent non encore figurées de chaque genre d'animaux: Paris, J.B. Baillière
 Nordsieck, F. (1973). Il genere Tricolia Risso, 1826 nei mari d'Europa. La Conchiglia. 55-56: 3-10.
 Gofas S. (1982). The genus Tricolia in the Eastern Atlantic and the Mediterranean. Journal of Molluscan Studies 48: 182–213
 Gofas, S.; Le Renard, J.; Bouchet, P. (2001). Mollusca, in: Costello, M.J. et al. (Ed.) (2001). European register of marine species: a check-list of the marine species in Europe and a bibliography of guides to their identification. Collection Patrimoines Naturels, 50: pp. 180–213

External links
 CLEMAM
 
 Megerle von Mühlfeld J.C. (1824). Beschreibung einiger neuen Conchylien. Verhandlungen der Gesellschaft naturforschender Freunde zu Berlin. 1(4): 205-221, pl. 7-9
 Anton, H. E. (1838). Verzeichniss der Conchylien welche sich in der Sammlung von Herrmann Eduard Anton befinden. Herausgegeben von dem Besitzer. Halle: Anton. xvi + 110 pp
 Risso, A. (1826-1827). Histoire naturelle des principales productions de l'Europe Méridionale et particulièrement de celles des environs de Nice et des Alpes Maritimes. Paris, F.G. Levrault. 3(XVI): 1-480, 14 pls
 Payraudeau, B. C. (1826). Catalogue descriptif et méthodique des annelides et des mollusques de l'Ile de Corse; avec huit planches représentant quatre-vingt-huit espèces, dont soixante-huit nouvelles. 218 pp. Paris
 Bucquoy E., Dautzenberg P. & Dollfus G. (1882-1886). Les mollusques marins du Roussillon. Tome Ier. Gastropodes. Paris: Baillière & fils. 570 pp., 66 pls
 Monterosato, T. A. di. (1880). Notizie intorno ad alcune conchiglie delle coste d'Africa. Bullettino della Società Malacologica Italiana. 5 (11–15): 213–233
 Monterosato, T. A. di. (1884). Nomenclatura generica e specifica di alcune conchiglie mediterranee. Virzi, printed for the author, Palermo, 152 pp.
 Dautzenberg, Ph. (1883). Liste de coquilles du Golfe de Gabès. J. conchyliol. 31: 289-330
 Gofas, S.; Le Renard, J.; Bouchet, P. (2001). Mollusca. in: Costello, M.J. et al. (eds), European Register of Marine Species: a check-list of the marine species in Europe and a bibliography of guides to their identification. Patrimoines Naturels. 50: 180-213

Phasianellidae
Gastropods described in 1824